Heavier Than Heaven, Lonelier Than God is the second full-length album by Philadelphia hardcore band Blacklisted, released through Deathwish Inc. on April 1, 2008, in both CD and vinyl format.

Track listing

Personnel 
Kurt Ballou – engineer
Alan Douches – mastering
Alex Garcia Rivera – drum technician

2008 albums
Blacklisted (band) albums
Deathwish Inc. albums
Albums with cover art by Jacob Bannon